Jordan Is a Hard Road is a 1915 American silent drama film directed by Allan Dwan and starring Dorothy Gish, Frank Campeau and Sarah Truax. The production was under the overall supervision of D. W. Griffith, and was the first film made by Dwan for Griffith's company Fine Arts. The evangelist Billy Sunday acted as a consultant. The film is set in Canada, with location shooting taking place for two weeks around Big Bear Lake in the San Bernardino Mountains. No prints are known to exist, and is therefore believed to be a lost film.

Plot
A criminal is sentenced to jail and gives his daughter up for adoption. Years later, after his release, he finds her working in a revivalist mission in a frontier town. In order not to disillusion her, he pretends to be an old friend of her father. Later, in order to raise vital funds for the mission, he takes part in a final train robbery in which he is mortally wounded.

Cast
 Dorothy Gish as Cora Findley 
 Frank Campeau as Bill Minden 
 Sarah Truax as Mrs. Findlay 
 Owen Moore as Mark Sheldon 
 Ralph Lewis as Jim Starbuck 
 Mabel Wiles as Lady Alicia Fairfax 
 Fred Burns as McMahon Man 
 Lester Perry as McMahon Man 
 Jim Kid as McMahon Man 
 Walter Long as Agent 
 Joseph Singleton as Pete Findley

References

Bibliography
 Frederic Lombardi. Allan Dwan and the Rise and Decline of the Hollywood Studios. McFarland, 2013.

External links
 

1915 films
1915 drama films
1910s English-language films
American silent feature films
Silent American drama films
Films directed by Allan Dwan
American black-and-white films
Films set in Canada
Lost American films
Triangle Film Corporation films
1915 lost films
Lost drama films
1910s American films